Psimon (Simon Jones) is a fictional supervillain appearing in comic books published by DC Comics.

Publication history
He first appeared in The New Teen Titans #3 (January 1981) and was created by George Pérez and Marv Wolfman.

Fictional character biography
Physicist Simon Jones was working on experiments in contacting other dimensions when he was contacted in turn by the demon Trigon the Terrible, the father of the superhero Teen Titan known as Raven. Trigon used his abilities to transform Jones into a powerful psychic with telepathic and telekinetic powers, and gave him the mission to destroy the Earth. Finding an ad by the psychopathic supervillain Doctor Light in the Underworld Star, a criminal underground paper, Jones, now calling himself Psimon, joined Light’s new group, the Fearsome Five. Psimon usurped Light’s role as the team’s leader during their first battle against the Teen Titans, in which he telepathically planted the suggestion in their minds to kill the Justice League. The plan failed, however, and the Five were defeated.

In The New Teen Titans #5 (March 1981), Trigon, growing impatient with Psimon's lack of progress, banished his psychic minion to another dimension. In The New Teen Titans #7 (May 1981), the remaining members of the Five attacked the Titans at their new headquarters, Titans Tower, and used their dimensional transmitter to return their teammate to them, but they were subsequently imprisoned.

Psimon’s teammate Gizmo eventually broke the team out of prison, and Psimon, now acting as team leader, led the Five in kidnapping Dr. Helga Jace in order to force her to make them an army of "Mud Men" to aid them in their battles. However, they were again defeated, this time by the combined forces of Batman, the Outsiders, and the Teen Titans.

Psimon later allied himself with the immortal dimensional traveler known as the Monitor during the seminal 1985 event known as Crisis on Infinite Earths. During this, the rest of the Five, feeling betrayed by Psimon, turned on him, apparently killing him. In Pre-Crisis continuity, Brainiac and the Earth-1 Lex Luthor saved Psimon from the Anti-Monitor's Shadow Demons and recruited him for their villain army, taking over Earths 4, S, and X. He became suspicious of the two villains' plans and, learning that they were going to take over the worlds by themselves once the heroes and villains were wiped out, attacked the two. He apparently destroyed Brainiac and went to finish off Luthor, only to have his brain blasted away by a recreated Brainiac in one of the more brutal surprise deaths of the storyline.

He later turned up alive, cutting a swath of destruction through another star system far from Earth, devastating the planets of Kallas and Talyn (home of Jarras Minion). He returned to Earth to seek revenge on those who had wronged him. Finding his former teammates Mammoth and Shimmer at a Tibetan monastery, having renounced a life of crime, he attacked them, driving a spear through Mammoth’s head and turning Shimmer into glass and then shattering her. When he found Gizmo, he shrunk the diminutive inventor down to subatomic size. He then attacked and psychically tortured the Teen Titans, but was defeated and placed in the custody of the interstellar police force known as the Darkstars, and later imprisoned in the metahuman prison known as the Slab.

Psimon was present during the "Last Laugh" riots initiated by the Joker in the 2001-2002 crossover storyline Joker: Last Laugh. In Outsiders (vol. 3) #6 (January 2004), he managed to engineer a massive prison breakout and escape when the cult leader Brother Blood had taken over the prison in an attempt to activate a global satellite system.

Psimon later joined up with frequent Captain Marvel archenemy Dr. Sivana, who, in a storyline in Outsiders (vol. 3) #12 -15 (July–October 2004), freed Psimon’s former teammates Mammoth, Gizmo, and Jinx from prison, and was able to successfully restore Shimmer’s shattered form, returning her to life. Despite lingering animosity between Psimon and Mammoth, Sivana put the team to work for him in a scheme to short sell Lexcorp stock by having them steal its accounts from its corporate building in Metropolis, and then driving down the stock by killing all the people in the building, and destroying two other Lexcorp properties. At the latter of the two, a microchip processor factory of Lexcorp's subsidiary, Kellacor, the Five were confronted by the Outsiders. After escaping, the criminally unsophisticated Five urged Sivana to take Lexcorp's nuclear missile facility near Joshua Tree, California. When Sivana refused, Psimon asserted that they would take it anyway, and in response, Sivana killed Gizmo with a laser blast to the head, and severed relations with the remaining four, warning them that he would kill them if they ever crossed his path again. The Five decided to initiate the plan themselves, but were defeated in their plan to take the facility and fire a nuclear missile at Canada. Mammoth was returned to the metahuman prison on Alcatraz Island, but Psimon and the others remained at large.

Most recently, Psimon was seen among the new Injustice League and was one of the villains featured in Salvation Run. Exiled to a savage new world, he attempted to convince his fellow super-villains that escape was impossible, and then proceeded to lay down plans for beginning a new civilization. He was interrupted by the Joker, who murdered him by breaking the dome which houses his brain and repeatedly smashing it with a rock.

The New 52
In The New 52 timeline, Psimon is shown to be a boy with the ability to kill people with his mind. On his first appearance, he kills everyone in a coffee shop from mere frustration. Later, he is spotted in the middle of a street, killing a car driver who has yelled at him, when Trigon materializes in the middle of the sky. In the following battle between Trigon and the Teen Titans, Trigon comments on the boy's powers. When police reinforcements appear and shoot towards the battle scene, he kills the entire troop. Seeing this, Beast Boy squeezes him, resulting the both of them to cancel out each other's powers and rendering them unconscious.

Psimon is later seen as a prisoner in the Metropolis Armory Ward (M.A.W.) talking to Doctor Psycho.

Psimon later appears as a member of the Fearsome Five. The group is seen as part of the Secret Society, who are allied with the Crime Syndicate, where he and the other members of the Fearsome Five, Jinx, Mammoth, Gizmo and Shimmer, team up with Doctor Psycho and Hector Hammond to fight against Cyborg and the Metal Men. He ends up being defeated by Platinum.

DC Rebirth
During DC Rebirth, Psimon, along with the rest of the Fearsome Five, feigns being reformed and creates a business called Meta Solutions with the purpose of helping people who develop metahuman powers. Their enterprise attracts the attention of the Titans when Karen Beecher starts manifesting metahuman powers and goes to Meta Solutions for help only to discover the criminals are running the operation. Its true purpose is to strip metahumans of their powers and sell them to the highest bidders. During a stakeout, Nightwing and Flash are captured by Mammoth. Once the rest of the Titans arrive to rescue them, the Fearsome Five easily subdue them. During the battle, Psimon clashes with Omen, the Titans’ psychic, and a bitter rivalry quickly develops between the two telepaths. As the villains prepare to kill the Titans, Karen Beecher arrives and, using her powers, swiftly defeats Mammoth, Shimmer, Gizmo and Jinx. Psimon manages to pin her down and extract a sample of her memories before being knocked out by Omen.

Psimon is incarcerated at Stryker’s Island when he is interviewed by Lilith Clay. She succeeds in tricking him into revealing the location of Karen Beecher's memory engram and that Psimon is working for H.I.V.E. He then confesses to her that he has had a premonition about an imminent threat and that one of the Titans will betray the team. Omen believes she is the one he is talking about and leaves after fighting off his attempt to attack her.

Psimon is later teleported from his cell to H.I.V.E.’s ruined headquarters by Mister Twister. The latter possesses him and enhances his mental powers, granting him an enlarged cranium and a new suit. Psimon once again clashes with Lilith Clay along with the Key, Mister Twister and a possessed Gnarrk and Mal Duncan, fighting the Titans to a standstill until a portal opens revealing the culprit to be Troia, a version of Donna Troy from a possible future. Psimon continues battling the Titans until Donna Troy manages to send Troia back through the portal, releasing him from her control. Psimon is then knocked out by Garth.

Personality and abilities
An arrogant, power-hungry sadist, Psimon does not always kill his victims, but prefers to instill his opponents with fear. He once attempted, for example, to fire a nuclear missile at Canada, simply because he thought it would terrify the world.

Psimon possesses powerful telepathic and telekinetic abilities. With his telepathy, he can read minds, take over other people’s minds to force them to do his bidding, cast telepathic illusions so that he or others may appear to be someone else. His telekinesis allows him to move objects, and can even affect large objects in his presence but outside his line of sight, as when he caused a ceiling to collapse onto Outsider Nightwing. Devices known as psychic dampeners can be used to prohibit him from using his powers, either by having him wear one, as had been done when he was incarcerated in the Slab, or by being worn by a potential victim, though Psimon can override the dampener’s effectiveness by coming into physical contact with the victim, specifically by placing his hands on the victim’s head.

Other versions
 In the alternate timeline of the "Flashpoint" storyline, Psimon is imprisoned in military Doom prison as Atomic Skull's cellmate.
 In Smallville season 11, the comic-follow up to Smallville, Dr. Simon Jones/Psimon makes an appearance as a past experiment of LuthorCorp's conducted by Lex Luthor for his super-soldier program: Project ARES. Psimon goes on a rampage in Metropolis until he is stopped by Superman and Impulse, and imprisoned in Stryker's.
 A kid version of Psimon appears in several issues of Tiny Titans.

In other media

Television

 Psimon makes non-speaking appearances in Teen Titans. This version is one of the Brotherhood of Evil's recruits.
 The Teen Titans incarnation of Psimon appears in the "New Teen Titans" segment of DC Nation Shorts.
 Psimon appears in Young Justice, voiced by Alan Tudyk. This version is a member of the Light via Queen Bee and the sub-group Onslaught who frequently makes puns based on "Simon Says" whenever he is controlling someone and battles Miss Martian in psychic combat. Additionally, he eventually enters a relationship with fellow Onslaught member Devastation.

Video games
 Psimon appears as a boss in Young Justice: Legacy, voiced by Jeff Bennett. 
 Psimon appears in DC Universe Online as part of the "Sons of Trigon" DLC.
 Psimon appears as a playable character in Lego DC Super-Villains.

Miscellaneous
 The Teen Titans animated series incarnation of Psimon appears in Teen Titans Go! as a founding member of the Fearsome Five.
 Psimon appears in DC Super Hero Girls as a background student of Super Hero High.

References

Fictional empaths
Fictional physicians
DC Comics characters who have mental powers
DC Comics metahumans 
DC Comics scientists
DC Comics supervillains
DC Comics telekinetics
DC Comics telepaths
Comics characters introduced in 1981
Characters created by George Pérez
Characters created by Marv Wolfman